Judith Kahan (born May 24, 1948) is an American actress and television writer.

Early years
Kahan was born May 24, 1948, in Roslyn Heights, New York, the daughter of Mr. and Mrs. Sidney Kahan. She attended Boston University's School of Fine and Applied Arts.

Career
Although she has primarily appeared in film and television roles, she has also appeared onstage in a number of theatrical productions, including a co-starring role as Fredrika Armfeldt in the original Broadway production of A Little Night Music from 1973–74.

Selected filmography

Actress
 Doc (1975–1976, TV Series) as Laurie Bogert Fenner
 All's Fair (1976–1977, TV Series) as Ginger Livingston
 Rush It (1977) as Catherine
 Free Country (1978) as Anna Bresner
 Mary (1978)
 Twice Upon a Time (1983) as The Fairy Godmother (voice) (credited as Judith Kahan Kampmann)
 Valerie's Family (1986–1987, TV Series) as Annie Steck
 Stealing Home (1988) as Laura Appleby
 Hot Shots! (1991) as Nurse
 Ferris Bueller (1990–1991, TV Series) as Grace
 Hot Shots! Part Deux (1993) as Veiled Woman
 Multiplicity (1996) as Franny
 Analyze This (1999) as Elaine Felton
 BuzzKill (2010) as Jill (final film role)

Writer
 Providence
 Moonlighting
 The Days and Nights of Molly Dodd
 St. Elsewhere
 SCTV Channel
 How to Eat Like a Child
 Love, Natalie
 Mary

References

External links

1948 births
Actresses from New York (state)
American film actresses
American musical theatre actresses
American television actresses
American television writers
Living people
People from Roslyn Heights, New York
American women television writers
American women screenwriters
20th-century American actresses
21st-century American actresses
Screenwriters from New York (state)